This is a chronological list of shootings committed by firearms in the state of Pennsylvania. Each of the following has a Wikipedia article that contains the incident's details, such as: the shooting, the shooter, the victim, and/or a related subject.

See also
 List of shootings in California
 List of shootings in Colorado
 List of shootings in Texas

References

Pennsylvania-related lists
Crime in Pennsylvania
Mass shootings in Pennsylvania
Lists of shootings by location